Dizaj-e Safar Ali (also Romanized as Dīzaj-e Şafar ‘Alī and Dīzaj Şafar ‘Alī; also known as Dizach and Dīzaj) is a village in Ozomdel-e Jonubi Rural District, in the Central District of Varzaqan County, East Azerbaijan Province, Iran. At the 2006 census, its population was 495, in 115 families.

References 

Towns and villages in Varzaqan County